RAE may stand for:

Arar Domestic Airport (IATA:RAE), Saudi Arabia
Radiodifusión Argentina al Exterior, Argentina's shortwave international broadcaster
RAE Bedford, Royal Aircraft Establishment (Bedford)
RAE Systems
RAE (Ring, Adair & Elwyn), tube, a type of Endotracheal tube used in anaesthesia
Real Academia Española (Royal Spanish Academy), official overseer of the Spanish language
Régional (ICAO code), a French airline
Relative age effect, whereby participation is higher amongst the eldest of an age group
Research Assessment Exercise
Restore America's Estuaries, Coastal Habitat Restoration non-profit organization
Retinol Activity Equivalents, a term referring to vitamin A activity
The Rock-afire Explosion
Royal Aircraft Establishment, Royal Aircraft Establishment (Farnborough)
Royal Australian Engineers, army corps
Russian Expo Arms, international military exhibition

See also
Rae (disambiguation)